Robidišče is Slovenia's westernmost settlement. It is located in the Municipality of Kobarid in the Littoral region on the border with Italy. It is located in the Breginj Combe.

Name
Robidišče was mentioned in written sources in 1763–87 as Robedisca. The name is derived from the Slovene common noun robidišče 'place where blackberries grow', from the common noun robida 'blackberry', which is also the source of related place names (e.g., Robidnica). In the local dialect, the settlement is known as Arbiešča.

References

External links

Robidišče on Geopedia
 The Breginj Combe - Robidišče - the westernmost Slovene village 

Populated places in the Municipality of Kobarid